Titanodula formosana is a species of praying mantis in the subfamily Hierodulinae. T. formosana is found in Taiwan, Malaysia and the Sunda islands.

Taxonomy 
T. formosana was originally placed in Hierodula, but a 2020 study moved the species to a new genus, Titanodula, based on its large size and the unique shape of the male genitalia.

References

formosana
Articles created by Qbugbot
Insects described in 1912